Carrizo Creek and Carrizo Wash may refer to various streams or washes (arroyos) named Carrizo, the Spanish word for "reeds".  Streams and washes of this name include:

Salton Sea tributaries
Carrizo Creek and Wash (California), a stream and arroyo in San Diego County and Imperial County, California

Gulf of California tributaries
Carrizo Wash, a wash under the Carrizo Bridges in Arizona
Carrizo Creek (Arizona), which forms north of Cibecue in Navajo County, Arizona, a tributary of the Salt River

Gulf of Mexico tributaries
Carrizo Creek (Mescalero Reservation, New Mexico), a tributary of the Rio Ruidoso
Carrizo Creek (New Mexico/Texas), sometimes termed Carrizo River, a tributary of Rita Blanca Creek
East Carrizo Creek, formed in Colorado north of Mt. Carrizo
West Carrizo Creek, formed in Colorado west-southwest of Kim
North Carrizo Creek, formed in Baca County, Colorado from the confluence of East and West Carrizo Creek, flowing into Oklahoma
South Carrizo Creek, formed near the Oklahoma/New Mexico state line and flowing into the Cimarron River

See also
Carrizo Creek Station, a former stagecoach station on Carrizo Creek in California